The 1945 Wayne Tartars football team represented Wayne University (later renamed Wayne State University) as an independent during the 1945 college football season. The team compiled a 2–5–1 record.

Joe Gembis was in his 14th and final year as head coach. Nicholas Cherup was the team captain. Cherup was also selected as the most valuable player.

Schedule

References

Wayne
Wayne State Warriors football seasons
Wayne Tartars football